Zawar Farid (born 25 July 1992) is a Pakistani-born cricketer who plays for the United Arab Emirates national cricket team. In July 2019, he was named in the United Arab Emirates' squad for their Twenty20 International (T20I) series against the Netherlands. He made his T20I debut for the United Arab Emirates against the Netherlands on 6 August 2019. In September 2019, he was named in the United Arab Emirates' squad for the 2019 ICC T20 World Cup Qualifier tournament in the UAE. In December 2019, he was named in the One Day International (ODI) squad for the 2019 United Arab Emirates Tri-Nation Series. He made his ODI debut for the United Arab Emirates, against Oman, on 5 January 2020. In December 2020, he was one of ten cricketers to be awarded with a year-long full-time contract by the Emirates Cricket Board.

References

External links
 

1992 births
Living people
Emirati cricketers
United Arab Emirates One Day International cricketers
United Arab Emirates Twenty20 International cricketers
Cricketers from Sahiwal
Pakistani emigrants to the United Arab Emirates
Pakistani expatriate sportspeople in the United Arab Emirates